S. Ramachandran is an Indian film journalist and film director. He directed some of the music videos made by Mauj Music, and other music videos with Asha Bhosle, Sanjay Dutt, Brett Lee, Urmila Matondkar.

Career
Ramachandran was involved in Pooja Bhatt's film Holiday heading the film's marketing and PR. He was also involved in Pooja Bhatt's film Jism 2 starring Sunny Leone in which he looked after the marketing and PR for the film and also handled the making of the movie using both his companies Sanskriti Media and Entertainment, and Brandstand.

Ramachandran was also the director of music videos made by Mauj Music, starring Asha Bhosle and a string of celebrities called Asha And Friends. He also directed music videos with Asha Bhosle, Sanjay Dutt, Brett Lee, Urmila Matondkar. with Ismail Darbar, Zubeen Garg and Neetu Chandra called Rasiya Saajan.

Ramachandran also produced the short film Talk To Me, which was sent to several festivals. He was also the producer of the now shelved film Imaandaari ki Maa Ki Aankh whose mahurat clap was given by Pooja Bhatt. He is also the associate producer of the film Doctor I Love You, which is set for release this year.

He has also made documentary films.

Early years and personal life
Ramachandran was born in Kolkata at the Saradadevi hospital at the Ramakrishna Mission. He was born to Krishnaveni and VS Srinivasan. Srinivasan was working in the Indian Express Newspaper in Mumbai.

References

External links
 

Living people
Film directors from Mumbai
Film directors from Kolkata
Year of birth missing (living people)